Hohenau an der Raab is a former municipality in the district of Weiz in the Austrian state of Styria. Since the 2015 Styria municipal structural reform, it is part of the municipality Passail.

Geography
Hohenau an der Raab is located in the east of Styria.

The highest point is the Siebenkögel at 1409 m in the north.

References

Cities and towns in Weiz District
Graz Highlands